Yakub or Yaqub (also transliterated in other ways) is a male given name. It is the Arabic version of Jacob and  James. The Arabic form Ya'qūb/Ya'kūb may be direct from the Hebrew or indirectly through Syriac. The name was in use in pre-Islamic Arabia and is a common given name in Arab, Turkish, and Muslim societies. It is also used as a surname. It is common in Polish, Czech and Slovak languages, where it is transliterated as Jakub.

Yakub may also refer to:

Religious figures
Yāˈqub bin Isḥāq bin Ibrāhīm (Jacob), prophet of Islam
Yakub (Nation of Islam), creator of the white race according to that belief system
Syed Yaqub, a 14th-century Sufi Muslim figure in the Sylhet region
Yaqub al-Charkhi (1360–1360), Naqshbandi Sheykh and student of Khwaja Baha' al-Din Naqshband

Other people with this given name

Pre-modern times
Ya'qub al-Mansur, Almohad ruler Reigned from 1184 to 1199.
Ya'qub ibn Abdallah al-Mansur (b. 760s) was the third son of al-Mansur (r. 754–775) from his wife Fatima.
Ya'qub ibn Killis (930–991), Egyptian vizier
Ya'qub-i Laith Saffari, Persian leader
Yakub Çelebi, Ottoman Sehzade, son of Sultan Murad I 
Yaqub Beg (1820–1877), Tajik adventurer
Yaqub Ibn as-Sikkit (died 857), philologist tutor, grammarian and scholar of poetry
Yaqub ibn Ibrahim al-Ansari
Yaqub Spata (died 1416), last Lord of Arta
Yaqub al-Mustamsik was the fifteenth century figurehead caliph of Mamluk Sultanate.
Yaqub-Har, pharaoh of ancient Egypt
Yaqūb ibn Tāriq, Persian astronomer and mathematician

Modern times
Sardar Yaqoob Khan Nasar, former Member of the National Assembly of Pakistan
Yacoub Al-Mohana (born 1975), Kuwaiti film and musical director
Yacoub Artin (1842–1919), ethnic Armenian educator and scholar
Yacoub Makzoume (born 1995), Syrian tennis player
Yacoub Masboungi (born 1948), Lebanese former swimmer
Yacoub Romanos (1935–2011), Lebanese wrestler
Yacoub Sarraf (born 1961), Lebanese politician
Yacoub Shaheen (born 1994), Palestinian singer
Yacoub Zaiadeen (?–2015), Jordanian politician and surgeon
Yacub Addy (1931–2014), Ghanaian drummer, composer, choreographer and educator
Yakub Ali Chowdhury, Bengali essayist
Yakub Ali, politician
Yakub Cemil, Ottoman soldier in the 1913 Ottoman coup d'état
Yakub Guznej (1892–?), Belarusian socio-political and military leader
Yakub Hasan Sait (1875–1940), Indian businessman, freedom-fighter and politician
Yakub Holovatsky (1814–1888), Galician historian, literary scholar, ethnographer, linguist, bibliographer, lexicographer, and poet
Yakub Idrizov (born 1993), Bulgarian footballer
Yakub Kadri Karaosmanoğlu, Turkish diplomat
Yakub Khan Mehboob Khan (1904–1958), Indian film actor and director
Yakub Kolas (1882–1956), Belarusian writer
Yakub Memon (1962–2015), Indian terrorist
Yakub Shah Chak (died 1593), last native ruler of Kashmir
Yakub Shevki Pasha, General of the Ottoman Army and Turkish Army
Yaqoob Abdul Baki (born 1979), Omani football referee
Yaqoob Al-Qasmi, Omani footballer
Yaqoob Ali (born 1980), Pakistani-born Irish cricketer
Yaqoob Bizanjo, Pakistani politician
Yaqoob Butt (born 1988), footballer
Yaqoob Juma Al-Mukhaini (born 1982), Omani footballer
Yaqoob Salem Al-Farsi (born 1982), Omani footballer
Yaqoob Salem Eid (born 1996), Bahraini sprinter
Yaqub al-Ghusayn (1899–1947), Palestinian leader
Yaqub al-Mansur, Sultan of Morocco
Yaqub Ali Sharif, politician
Yaqub Eyyubov (born 1945), Azerbaijani politician
Yaqub Kareem, Nigerian boxer of the 2000s and 2010s
Yaqub Mirza (born 1946), Pakistani businessman
Yaqub Qureishi, Indian politician
Yaqub Salimov, Tajik politician
Yaqub Sanu (1839–1912), Egyptian journalist

People with this surname
Abdul Razzak Yaqoob (1944–2014), Pakistani expatriate businessman based in Dubai
 Ahmad Muin Yaacob, Malaysian convicted murderer 
Aminata Aboubakar Yacoub (born 1989), Republic of the Congo swimmer
Asif Yaqoob (born 1973), Pakistani cricket umpire
Atta Yaqub (born 1979), Scottish model and actor of Pakistani descent
Charles Yacoub, Lebanese-Canadian bus hijacker
Chaudhry Yaqoob, Pakistani police officer
Gabriel Yacoub, French musician, songwriter, and visual artist
Hala Al-Abdallah Yacoub (born 1956), Syrian cinematographer and director
Halimah Yacob (born 1954), President of Singapore
Joseph Yacoub (born 1944), Syrian professor
Magdi Yacoub (born 1935), Egyptian-British professor
Mirza Yaqoob (born 1974), Bahraini cricketer
Mo Yaqub (born 1994), Scottish footballer
 (1937–2011), Tunisian art historian
Mohammad Yakub, Indian cricketer
Mohammad Yaqoob (born 1990), eldest son of Mullah Mohammed Omar
Muhammad Hussein Yacoub (born 1956), Arab Islamic scholar
Muhammad ibn Ya'qub al-Kulayni (860s–941), Persian Shia hadith collector
Muhammad Yaqub, a Pakistani banker
Paola Yacoub (born 1966), artist based in Berlin and Beirut
Rami Yacoub (born 1975), Swedish-Palestinian record producer and songwriter
Reham Yacoub (1991–2020), Iraqi human rights advocate and doctor
Roman Yakub (born 1958), American composer
Rutaba Yaqub, Saudi Arabian singer
Sahibzada Muhammad Yaqoob (born 1952), Pakistani politician
Salma Yaqoob (born 1971), British political activist
Septar Mehmet Yakub (1904–1991), Crimean Tatar lawyer, thinker, and spiritual leader
Simon Yacoub (born 1989), Palestinian judoka
Souheila Yacoub (born 1992), Swiss gymnast and actress
Talat Yaqoob, a Scottish campaigner, writer, and commentator
Waleed Yaqub (born 1974), Pakistani cricket umpire

See also
 Yakup, Turkish form of the name

References

External links

Arabic masculine given names
Arabic-language surnames